Tonbu may refer to:
 Tonbu-e Bala
 Tonbu-e Payin